Lung Chien (1916 – May 28, 1975), also known by the name Kim Lung, was a prolific Chinese film director and screenwriter active between the 1950s and the 1970s.

Career

Born in 1916, Lung Chien explores common themes in Hong Kong cinema such as mixed martial arts or violence in everyday life. He directed more than 30 films mostly in Taiwan and Hong Kong. He died in Taipei in 1975 at the age of 59.

Filmography

As screenwriter

As director

 The Bridge at Lo-Yang (1975) 
 Fatal Strike (1974)
 Gold Snatchers (1973)
 Kung Fu Powerhouse (1973)
 Wang Yu, King of Boxers (1973)
 The Angry Hero (1973)
 Blood of the Leopard (1972)
 Boxers of Loyalty and Righteousness (1972)
 Queen of Fist (1972)̽
 Extreme Enemy (1971)
 Struggle Karate (1971)
 Ghost Lamp (1971)
 The Bravest Revenge (1970)
 The Darkest Sword (1970)
 Golden Sword and the Blind Swordswoman (1970)
 The Ringing Sword (1969)
 Knight of the Sword (1969)
 Flying Over Grass (1969)
 Dragon Tiger Sword (1968)
 Dragon Inn (1967)
 Queen of Female Spies (1967)
 The Wandering Knight (1966)
 Malaysian Tiger (1966)

As actor 

 1956: Yun He Xun Qing Ji
 1957: Wanhua Skeleton Incident	 	 
 1957: Murder at Room 7, Keelung City	 
 1957: Mei Ting En Chou Chi	 	 
 1962: Five Difficult Traps	 
 1963: Father Tiring Child	 	 
 1964: Ba Mao Chuan	 	 
 1965: Three Beautiful Blind Female Spies	 	 
 1971: Darkest Sword
 1973: Wang Yu, King of Boxers
 1976: Calamity

References

External links

Kim Lung at Hong Kong Cinemagic

Hong Kong film directors
Chinese male actors
1916 births
1975 deaths
Deaths in Taiwan
20th-century screenwriters